Ulan Tuya (born September 7, 1983, also known as Ulan Tuyo or Wulan Tuya) is a female Chinese singer and songwriter of Mongolian ethnicity.

In 2014, she attended the 2014 CCTV Spring Festival Gala with her teacher, Ri-Na Wu, where they performed a rendition of her hit "Horse Pole." In 2019, she attended the 2019 CCTV Spring Festival Gala with Shi Peng, Sha Yi, Hu Ke, Yun Duo, and Yun Fei, and performed the song "Praise the New Era" at the live broadcast party.

A number of her songs make use of the Morin khuur, a traditional ethnic Mongolian instrument.

Early life and career
Ulan Tuya was born on September 7, 1983, in Horqin Grassland, Inner Mongolia, China and graduated from Minzu University of China.

In June 2011, she officially entered the entertainment business with the release of the song "Horse Pole", which allowed her to gain more attention.

Discography

Studio albums
Horse Pole (套马杆)（2011）
Praise the New Era (点赞新时代) （2019）
Phoenix Flies (凤凰飞）（2011）
Hit Song for Love（火辣辣的情歌）（2011）
Love Brother in Grassland（草原情哥哥）（2011）
Long Tune of World Music（世界音乐长调）（2012）
Beautiful Grassland（醉美草原）（2012）
Mom's Love（妈妈的恩情）（2012）
Vanilla（原香草）（2013）
Golden Grassland（金色的草原）（2012）

Singles
Girl of Arxan（阿尔山的姑娘）（2015）
Standing on the grassland and looking at Beijing（站在草原望北京）（2012）
 Mongolian Flower

Concerts

Awards

|-
| rowspan="3"|2019 || rowspan="2"|Praise the New Era || The third China weifang golden kite international micro film competition best music micro film award  || 
|}

|-
| rowspan="3"|2018 || rowspan="2"|Standing on the grassland and looking at Beijing || Selected into 40 representative songs of China's reform and opening up 40 years  || 
|}

References 

Living people
Chinese women singer-songwriters
1983 births
Chinese people of Mongolian descent